A  is a class or category of Japanese cities.  It is a local administrative division created by the national government. Core cities are delegated many functions normally carried out by prefectural governments, but not as many as designated cities. To become a candidate for core city status, a city must have a population greater than 300,000 and an area greater than 100 square kilometers, although special exceptions may be made by order of the cabinet for cities with populations under 300,000 but over 200,000. After the abolition of special city status on April 1, 2015, any city with a population above 200,000 may apply for core city status.

Application for designation is made by a city with the approval of both the city and prefectural assemblies.

History
The term "core city" was created by the first clause of Article 252, Section 22 of the Local Autonomy Law of Japan.

List of core cities
As of 1 April 2021, 62 cities have been designated core cities:

Former core cities

Scheduled to become a core city

Cities that meet the requirements but have not yet been nominated 
The following cities have populations greater than 200,000 but have not yet been nominated. (Cities planning to apply for core city status are not shown.)

See also
 Administrative division
 Urban area

References

External links
  "Japan's Evolving Nested Municipal Hierarchy: The Race for Local Power in the 2000s", by A. J. Jacobs at Urban Studies Research, Vol. 2011 (2011); 
 "Large City System of Japan"—graphic shows core cities compared with other Japanese city types at p. 1 (PDF p. 7 of 40)
 "Growth in Second Tier Cities - Urban Policy Lessons from Japan"—briefing by CLAIR London on classes of Japanese cities (PDF)